The Second Victory is a 1987 British drama film directed by Gerald Thomas, set in Allied-occupied Austria at the end of the Second World War. Anthony Andrews stars as a British officer accused of shooting his sergeant. With Helmut Griem and Max von Sydow.

External links

1987 films
1980s English-language films
1987 drama films
Films directed by Gerald Thomas
Films scored by Stanley Myers
Films shot at Pinewood Studios
Films set in 1945
Films set in 1946
Films set in Austria
British drama films
Films based on works by Morris West
1980s British films